Larry Nord (born c. 1937) is a former member of the Ohio House of Representatives.

References

Republican Party members of the Ohio House of Representatives
1930s births
Living people